Mad Clip (born Panagiotis Peter Anastasopoulos, ; May 25, 1987 – September 2, 2021) was an American-Greek rapper and songwriter. He released many songs such as "Dealer", "Kotera", "Sinthikes", which have grossed more than ten million pageviews in YouTube. He released four albums: Super Trapper, O Amerikanos LP, Super Trapper 2 and Still Active featuring Strat. A fifth album named “Money And Drugs Can’t Live In Poverty” was released posthumously on April 29, 2022. From the beginning of his music career he kept the artistic name Mad Clip which comes from the initials "Money and Drugs, Can't Live in Poverty".

Early life 

Mad Clip was born on May 25, 1987 in New York City as Panagiotis Peter Anastasopoulos. He came from a Greek-American family. Since 1999 onwards, he divided his life between Greece and US for many years, living in Paleo Faliro, the birth place of his father.

Career 
Rapper Taki Tsan helped Mad Clip to release the single Eimai Trelos at the age of 27. Shortly after he signed with Capital Music. He had been a member of Outkast Exellence O.E. since 2004 with Constantine The G and N.O.E., where he performed in English.

He had lived in Greece permanently from 2016 until his death, where he became famous, despite his ambition to succeed abroad. Mad Clip expressed his preference for luxury living with expensive cars and clothes, both privately and in his songs. He was one of the most popular singers of recent years, with many of his songs topping greek charts. It has been reported that due to his work, Mad Clip has significantly contributed to the rise in popularity of trap music in Greece.

Death 
Mad Clip died at the age of 34 on September 2, 2021, after a car accident in Vouliagmeni.

References 

1987 births
2021 deaths
Greek rappers
Rappers from New York City
Road incident deaths in Greece
Musicians from Athens